Aceratherium (Greek: "without (a) horn" (keratos), "beast" (therion)) was a genus of rhinoceros of the subfamily Aceratheriinae that lived in Eurasia during the Miocene.

Taxonomy
 
Aceratherium was coined by Kaup (1832) for "Rhinoceros" incisivum Cuvier, 1822 on the basis of the similarity of two skulls from Eppelsheim, Germany to the holotype incisor tooth from Weisenau in dental structure. However, the tooth from Weisenau has been recognized as belonging to a member of Teleoceratini, although the name Aceratherium has been widely used for the Eppelsheim skulls. Traditionally, many species have been referred to Aceratherium on the basis of them being hornless, turning the genus into a wastebasket. Revisions over the years have removed most species to the point that there are now only three valid species generally recognized (A. incisivum, A. depereti, and A. porpani).

Description
Its brachyodont dentition suggest it was a browser which fed on leaves and soft vegetables. It had fairly long limbs compared to other Aceratheriinae, and was proportioned similar to a tapir. Males had tusk-like incisors that were much larger than those of the females.

References

Miocene rhinoceroses
Miocene mammals of Asia
Miocene mammals of Europe
Cenozoic animals of Asia
Cenozoic mammals of Europe
Miocene genus extinctions